The Trinity Forum (TTF) is an American faith-based non-profit Christian organization founded in 1991 by author and social critic Os Guinness and American businessman and philanthropist Alonzo L. McDonald.

The current president of the Trinity Forum is Cherie Harder. The Trinity Forum is a member of the Evangelical Council for Financial Accountability.

References

External links
The Trinity Forum website

Christian parachurch organizations